Ludvík Kománek (7 August 1909 – 19 January 1994) was a Czech hurdler. He competed in the men's 110 metres hurdles at the 1936 Summer Olympics.

References

External links
 

1909 births
1994 deaths
Athletes (track and field) at the 1936 Summer Olympics
Czech male hurdlers
Olympic athletes of Czechoslovakia
Place of birth missing